Lost One is a song recorded by American singer-songwriter Jazmine Sullivan. It was released by RCA Records on August 28, 2020, as the lead single from her debut extended play Heaux Tales. It was written by Sullivan, and co-written and produced by Dave Watson.

Background
Sullivan revealed in December 2019 that she was working on new music and that "an EP is on the way". On August 21, 2020, Sullivan posted a picture via her Instagram account of her performing in her house with three people holding instruments in front of her. Six days later, she announced that a single titled "Lost One" would be released later at midnight EST.

Cover versions and other usages
In September 2020, Avery Wilson released a cover version of "Lost One".

Charts

Release history

References

2020 singles
2020 songs
2020s ballads
Jazmine Sullivan songs
Songs written by Jazmine Sullivan